
The Australian Effects & Animation Festival (AEAF) is an annual international festival of visual effects (VFX), animation games and immersive media. The event, which includes an awards ceremony known as the AEAF Awards, a program of speakers, and technology showcase, is streamed live. The inaugural event was in 2000.

Awards

The AEAF Awards are given in a ceremony held in Sydney, New South Wales. There is no charge for entry to the competition. , gold, silver and bronze awards are given in the following categories:

Commercials, animation
Commercials, VFX
Feature films, animation
Feature Films, VFX
Web Viral
 Titles & Openers for TV and Feature Film
 Idents
 Short film
 TV series and TV series children
 Music video
 TV student
 Games cinematics
 Education & infographics
Live event
 Augmented reality
 VR360
  VR Experience

Special Merit Awards may be given "to works of outstanding merit that push the boundaries of visual artistry and introduce new techniques".

2019

In 2019, the awards ceremony was held at the Chauvel Cinema in Paddington.

2021

Winners included:

Godzilla vs. Kong, Weta Digital, Gold, for Feature Film – VFX
Jingle Jangle: A Christmas Journey, Framestore, Gold, for Feature Film – Sequence
His Dark Materials Series 2,  Framestore Gold, for TV Series

References

External links
AEAF Awards on IMDb

21st-century awards

Arts awards in Australia

2001 establishments in Australia
Australian film awards